' WinneToons ' is a 26-part German cartoon series that is loosely based on characters from the novel Winnetou 1st part by Karl May. The first episode ran on March 30, 2002, on ARD. Then the episodes were repeated on the KiKA. The pilot was released on DVD by Universal. In 2009 there was a cinema adaptation with the title WinneToons - The legend of the treasure in Silbersee.

Content 

The individual completed episodes depict child-friendly adventure stories, without explicit depictions of violence or bloody scenes, from the time of the characters Winnetou and Old Shatterhand between their blood brotherhood and the murder of Winnetou's father Intschu Tschuna and his sister Nschotschi. All stories are fictitious and do not appear in the original novel. Many other people from the Karl May universe accompany her on her adventures, such as Hobble Frank, Aunt Droll, and Sam Hawkens.

Since the series is also marketed internationally, it was subtitled "The World of Karl May" on the DVD and the soundtrack.

Although the series was written in the USA and created by cartoonists in China, some concessions to the Japanese anime style have been incorporated into the series for the international market. Nschotschi is accompanied by two animals, fast food, a coyote, and Misty, a skunk.

Curiosity: As in the Karl May films (played by Lex Barker ), Old Shatterhand does not wear a cowboy hat in this series either.

Music

The serial music was written by Adrian Askew. The title melody is a modification of "Ride the Hurricane's Eye" by the Rednex group.

Synchronization

Literature

 Ekkehard Bartsch / Karl May: `` WinneToons '', Karl-May-Verlag  (picture book)

See also
List of German television series

External links
 

German animated television series
2000s Western (genre) television series
2002 German television series debuts
2002 German television series endings
German-language television shows
Television shows based on German novels
Animated television shows based on films
Western (genre) animated television series
Television shows based on works by Karl May